Qeymas Khan (also Romanized as Qeymās Khān and Qeymāskhān) is a village in Benajuy-ye Shomali Rural District, in the Central District of Bonab County, East Azerbaijan Province, Iran. At the 2006 census, its population was 47, in 10 families.

References 

Populated places in Bonab County